Rekoa stagira, the smudged hairstreak or Stagira hairstreak, is a butterfly in the family Lycaenidae. It is found from Mexico south through Central America, including Nicaragua to Brazil.

References

Butterflies described in 1867
Eumaeini
Butterflies of North America
Butterflies of Central America
Lycaenidae of South America
Taxa named by William Chapman Hewitson